This Life of Mine (Mandarin: Wo zhe yi bei zi 我這一輩子) is a 1950 Chinese film directed by Shi Hui.

Plot summary 
Adapted from the novella of the same name by Lao She, this film follows the life a Beijing police officer and his family from the fall of the Qing dynasty through the rise of Chinese Communism after World War II.

Cast 
Shi Hui as I
Heling Wei as Old Zhao
Yang Shen as Shen Yuan
Wei Li as Hai Fu
Zhi Cheng as Hu Li
Chaoming Cui as Sun Yuan
Xiu Jiang as Master Qin
Zhen Lin as Madame Qin
Ming Liang as Sun Yuanqin
Min Wang as My wife

External links 

1950 films
Chinese black-and-white films
1950s Mandarin-language films
Chinese historical drama films
1950s historical drama films